John Sullivan Wells (October 18, 1803August 1, 1860) was a United States senator from New Hampshire. Born in Durham, he attended Pembroke Academy, studied law, was admitted to the bar in 1828 and practiced in Guildhall, Vermont from 1828 to 1835. He moved to Lancaster, New Hampshire in 1836 and continued the practice of law until 1846. He was solicitor of Coos County from 1838 to 1847, and moved to Exeter, New Hampshire and resumed the practice of law.

Wells was a member of the New Hampshire House of Representatives from 1839 to 1841, serving as speaker in 1841. He was New Hampshire Attorney General in 1847, and a member and president of the New Hampshire Senate in 1851–1852. He was appointed to the U.S. Senate to fill the vacancy caused by the death of Moses Norris, Jr. and served from January 16 to March 3, 1855; he died in Exeter in 1860.

References

External links

 

1803 births
1860 deaths
Democratic Party United States senators from New Hampshire
New Hampshire Attorneys General
Democratic Party New Hampshire state senators
Democratic Party members of the New Hampshire House of Representatives
City and town attorneys in the United States
New Hampshire lawyers
Vermont lawyers
People from Exeter, New Hampshire
19th-century American politicians
19th-century American lawyers